This is a list of football clubs based in the British county of Staffordshire.

Men's clubs

League clubs
These clubs play in fully professional leagues, at levels 1–4 of the English football league system.

Non-league clubs
These clubs play in semi-professional and amateur leagues, at levels 5–10 of the English football league system. The list does not include reserve teams of clubs that may play further down the pyramid -

See also

List of football clubs in England

References

Staffordshire
Clubs
Staffordshire-related lists